Lawrence Kpabitey Kodjiku was a Ghanaian soldier and politician. He was the first Director of the National Service Secretariat from 1973 to 1975, Regional Commissioner (Regional  Minister) of the Ashanti Region from 1975 to 1977, Greater Accra Regional Commissioner from 1977 to 1978, and the Northern Regional Commissioner from 1978 to 1979.

Early life and education 
Kodjiku was born on 30 July 1931 at Odumase-Krobo. He had his early education at the Presbyterian Middle School in Bana Hill where he obtained his standard 7 certificate in 1947. He had his secondary education at the Presbyterian Secondary School (now the Presbyterian Boys Senior High School, Legon) from 1948 until 1952 when he received his Cambridge School Certificate. After his secondary school studies, he enrolled at the Presbyterian Teachers Training College, Akropong (now the Presbyterian College of Education, Akropong), where he was awarded his Teachers' Training Certificate (Teachers' Certificate 'A'). He entered the University of Ghana in 1962 where he was awarded his Bachelor of Arts degree in 1965.

Career 
Kodjiku begun as a teacher in 1955, teaching in primary, middle, and secondary schools and also Polytechnics until 1962 when he enrolled at the University of Ghana. Following his studies at the University of Ghana, he taught briefly at Prempeh College prior to his commissioning into the Ghana Armed Forces Education Corps in 1965. From 1965 until 1967, he taught at the Ghana Military Academy, he was later moved to the Ministry of Defence where he served as the Staff Officer of the ministry's Education Directorate from 1967 to 1973.

Upon the establishment of the National Service Secretariat in 1973, Kodjiku was appointed the secretariat's first director. He served in this capacity until 1975. In 1975, when the National Redemption Council (NRC) was reconstituted into the Supreme Military Council (SMC), he was appointed as the Regional Commissioner for the Ashanti Region. He worked in this office until 1977 when he was appointed Greater Accra Regional Commissioner. In 1979, he was appointed Regional Commissioner for the Northern Region under the Armed Forces Revolutionary Council. In 1992, he became a member of the 1992 Electoral Commission.

Personal life 
Kodjiku retired from public service in 1980 and went into farming. His hobbies include reading and hunting. He is married with four children.

References 

1931 births
Living people
Ghanaian soldiers

20th-century Ghanaian politicians
20th-century Ghanaian educators
Ga-Adangbe people
Presbyterian Boys' Senior High School alumni
Presbyterian College of Education, Akropong alumni
University of Ghana alumni
20th-century Ghanaian people